Gurgen II may refer to:

 Gurgen II of Tao (died in 941)
 Gurgen of Georgia, also known as Gurgen II Magistros (ruled 994–1008)